In complex analysis (a branch of mathematics), a pole is a certain type of singularity of a complex-valued function of a complex variable. It is the simplest type of non-removable singularity of such a function (see essential singularity).

This induces a duality between zeros and poles, that is fundamental for the study of meromorphic functions. For example, if a function is meromorphic on the whole complex plane plus the point at infinity, then the sum of the multiplicities of its poles equals the sum of the multiplicities of its zeros.

Definitions 

A zero of a meromorphic function  is a complex number  such that .

If  is a function that is meromorphic in a neighbourhood of a point  of the complex plane, then there exists an integer  such that 

Simple zero and simple pole are terms used for zeroes and poles of order  Degree is sometimes used synonymously to order.

This characterization of zeros and poles implies that zeros and poles are isolated, that is, every zero or pole has a neighbourhood that does not contain any other zero and pole.

Because of the order of zeros and poles being defined as a non-negative number  and the symmetry between them, it is often useful to consider a pole of order  as a zero of order  and a zero of order  as a pole of order . In this case a point that is neither a pole nor a zero is viewed as a pole (or zero) of order 0.

A meromorphic function may have infinitely many zeros and poles. This is the case for the gamma function (see the image in the infobox), which is meromorphic in the whole complex plane, and has a simple pole at every non-positive integer. Its zeros in the left halfplane are all the negative even integers, and the Riemann hypothesis is the conjecture that all other zeros are along .

In a neighbourhood of a point  a nonzero meromorphic function  is the sum of a Laurent series with at most finite principal part (the terms with negative index values):

At infinity
A function  is meromorphic at infinity if it is meromorphic in some neighbourhood of infinity (that is outside some disk), and there is an integer  such that 

exists and is a nonzero complex number.

In this case, the point at infinity is a pole of order  if , and a zero of order  if .

For example, a polynomial of degree  has a pole of degree  at infinity.

The complex plane extended by a point at infinity is called the Riemann sphere.

If  is a function that is meromorphic on the whole Riemann sphere, then it has a finite number of zeros and poles, and the sum of the orders of its poles equals the sum of the orders of its zeros. 

Every rational function is meromorphic on the whole Riemann sphere, and, in this case, the sum of orders of the zeros or of the poles is the maximum of the degrees of the numerator and the denominator.

Examples 

 The function

 is meromorphic on the whole Riemann sphere.

 The function
 
 is meromorphic on the whole Riemann sphere.

 The function
 
 is meromorphic in the whole complex plane, but not at infinity. This can be seen by writing the Taylor series of  around the origin.

 The function

 has a single pole at infinity of order 1, and a single zero at the origin.

All above examples except for the third are rational functions. For a general discussion of zeros and poles of such functions, see .

Function on a curve

The concept of zeros and poles extends naturally to functions on a complex curve, that is complex analytic manifold of dimension one (over the complex numbers). The simplest examples of such curves are the complex plane and the Riemann surface. This extension is done by transferring structures and properties through charts, which are analytic isomorphisms.

More precisely, let  be a function from a complex curve  to the complex numbers. This function is holomorphic (resp. meromorphic) in a neighbourhood of a point  of  if there is a chart  such that  is holomorphic (resp. meromorphic) in a neighbourhood of  Then,  is a pole or a zero of order  if the same is true for 

If the curve is compact, and the function  is meromorphic on the whole curve, then the number of zeros and poles is finite, and the sum of the orders of the poles equals the sum of the orders of the zeros. This is one of the basic facts that are involved in Riemann–Roch theorem.

See also
 
 Filter design
 Filter (signal processing)
 Gauss–Lucas theorem
 Hurwitz's theorem (complex analysis)
 Marden's theorem
 Nyquist stability criterion
 Pole–zero plot
 Residue (complex analysis)
 Rouché's theorem
 Sendov's conjecture

References

External links 
 

Complex analysis